SS Colombie was a French merchant ship and later converted to a hospital ship. She was named after Colombie.

Construction and career 

She was laid down, launched and commissioned in 1931 for Compagnie Générale Transatlantique. She was built by Ateliers et Chantiers de France, Dunkirk. 

Throughout the 1930s she serve as a merchant ship until 1940 where she was converted to an armed merchant ship till 1941. In December 1942, SS Colombie was taken over by US Army at Casablanca, Morocco. SS Colombie set off to New York to be converted to a troopship in 1943 by Arthur Tickle Engineering Company. She was still under jurisdiction of War Shipping Administration, with the French Line.

SS Columbie operated between the east coast of the United States and the Europe-Africa-Middle East theater of operations. Acquired by the US Army Transportation Service for conversion to a hospital ship by Arthur Tickle Engineering Company, between January and April 1945.

She was recommissioned as USAHS Aleda E. Lutz on 13 February 1945. Named after Lt. Aleda E. Lutz, she was most celebrated women war heroes during World War II. Lutz was the first American woman to die in combat during World War II and the highest decorated woman in the history of the U.S. military. USAHS Aleda E. Lutz moored pierside at Pearl Harbor from 21–34 November 1945.

She was decommissioned on 6 April 1946 and returned to the War Shipping Administration but few days later returned to the French Lines on 11 April 1946. SS Colombie was modernized and returned to commercial service on the Havre-West Indies route for Générale Transatlantique.

Her ownership was turned over to Typaldos Lines in 1964 and renamed SS Atlantica. But few years later not long after, Typaldos Lines bankrupt in 1968 and she was abandoned and sold for scrapping in 1974.

See also 
 Hospital ship
 French Line
 Aleda E. Lutz

References

External links 
 Navsource

Hospital ships
1931 ships
Hospital ships in World War II